The 2017–18 Football League is the second division of the Greek professional football league system and the seventh season under the name Football League after previously being known as Beta Ethniki. It will start at 28 October,

Teams

 1 Acharnaikos was expelled during the season

1. Agrotikos Asteras withdrew from the league. As a result of this they will participate in 2017–18 Gamma Ethniki. A.E. Karaiskakis were promoted from the Gamma Ethniki in their place.

2. Iraklis Thessaloniki withdrew from the league because of Financial Problems. The Founding Club (Athlitiki Enosis Pontion Katerini) stopped to exist too. The Original Gymnastikos Syllogos Iraklis will decide if a new Football Team will start from The Third Category of the Local Championship Macedonia Football Clubs Association, or if The Football Team Of G.S. Iraklis will be merged with 1st category (A1) Macedonia Football Clubs Association club Iraklis Ampelokipi, as it happened before 5 years with Athlitiki Enosis Pontion Katerinis F.C.. Doxa Dramas were promoted from the Gamma Ethniki in their place.

Structure 
There are eighteen clubs that compete in the Football League, playing each other in a home and away series. At the end of the season, the bottom six teams are relegated to Gamma Ethniki. The top two teams gain automatic promotion for Super League. All teams in the Football League take part in the Greek Football Cup.

League table

Matches

1 The opponents of Acharnaikos awarded a 3–0 w/o win each.
2 The opponents of Veria awarded a 3–0 w/o win each.
3 Game did not held

Top scorers
Updated to games played on 28 May 2018

References

2
Second level Greek football league seasons
Greece